David Charles Abell (born 1958) is an American orchestral conductor and multi-instrumentalist. Described as “a protean talent” with “impeccable and inspired” skill as a conductor, he is active in symphonic music, opera and musical theatre. Abell was one of Leonard Bernstein's last protégés, and collaborated with Bernstein on many works during the 1980s.

Abell is known for his television appearances worldwide as conductor of the Les Misérables' 10th and 25th Anniversary concerts. He is also recognized as an authoritative interpreter of the musicals of Stephen Sondheim. 

In addition to maintaining an active international opera career, Abell has worked to restore clarity to musical scores with poorly preserved source materials. As of 2017, Abell is a resident of London.

Early life and education
Born in Jacksonville, North Carolina, Abell was raised in the Philadelphia and Chicago areas, studying viola, piano, organ, trumpet and voice. As a member of the Berkshire Boy Choir, he sang in the 1971 world premiere of Leonard Bernstein's Mass at the John F. Kennedy Center for the Performing Arts. The experience sparked his interest in theatrical compositions and fuelled a lasting passion for dramatic music.

In 1976, Abell enrolled at Yale University, where his teachers included John Mauceri and Rob Kapilow. He studied with Nadia Boulanger and Robert D. Levin at the American Conservatory in Fontainebleau before returning to Yale to complete his B.A. in 1981.

Early professional career
In 1982, Abell participated in the inaugural Los Angeles Philharmonic Institute summer school, studying with Bernstein and Daniel Lewis. He continued his postgraduate training from 1983 to 1985 at the Juilliard School under Jorge Mester and Sixten Ehrling

Abell made his professional debut conducting Bernstein's Mass at Berlin's Deutschlandhalle in 1982. The following year he deputized at short notice for John Mauceri conducting Britten's The Turn of the Screw at Washington National Opera. In 1985 he made his New York City Opera debut conducting The Mikado. Abell led San Francisco Opera's 1989 national tour of Carmen and was conductor for City Opera's national tour of The Barber of Seville in 1994.

Collaborative work with Leonard Bernstein 
One of Leonard Bernstein's last protégés, he assisted the composer-conductor on many projects during the 1980s and helped prepare definitive editions of Bernstein's musical theatre scores.

Work since 1996
Since moving to London in 1996, Abell has conducted orchestras in the UK and abroad, including The Hallé, City of Birmingham, Bournemouth, London Philharmonic, BBC Symphony, Royal Philharmonic Orchestra, BBC National Orchestra of Wales, Seattle Symphony, Hong Kong Philharmonic, Iceland Symphony and West Australian Symphony orchestras. He is a regular guest conductor with the BBC Concert Orchestra, with whom he has appeared five times at the Proms.

Opera 
In recent years, Abell has made debuts at Cincinnati Opera (Porgy and Bess), Lyric Opera of Kansas City (Silent Night), Opera Philadelphia (Die Zauberflöte), and Hawaii Opera Theatre (Eugene Onegin).

Musical theatre 
The driving force behind Stephen Sondheim's 80th birthday celebration at the 2010 BBC Proms, Abell subsequently conducted the 25th anniversary concert of Les Misérables at the O2 Arena, which has been seen worldwide on television and released on DVD. Both the 25th and 10th Anniversary concerts have been extensively broadcast by PBS to boost fund-raising efforts.

Abell was Music Director of the West End production of Andrew Lloyd Webber's Love Never Dies from its opening in March 2010 until March 2011.  Between 2011 and 2014, he conducted the French premieres of four Sondheim musicals: Follies at the Opéra de Toulon, Sweeney Todd and Sunday in the Park with George and Into the Woods at the Théâtre du Châtelet in Paris.

Abell conducted London's Laurence Olivier Awards ceremony from 2011 to 2014. He has appeared twice at English National Opera, conducting Sweeney Todd with Bryn Terfel and Emma Thompson in 2015 and Carousel with Alfie Boe and Katherine Jenkins in 2017.

Pops career 
A regular guest conductor with the Philly Pops since his debut in 2013, Abell released a Christmas CD with them in 2015 and was appointed Principal Guest Conductor of the organization in 2017. He was named Music Director and Principal Conductor in February, 2020. He made his Boston Pops debut in 2016 with an all-Gershwin concert.

Music scholarship
Abell has helped restore clarity to musical theatre scores affected by accretions of revival productions and poorly preserved source materials, notably West Side Story. Along with pianist and musicologist Seann Alderking, he edited a complete edition of Cole Porter's Kiss Me, Kate, published in 2014. It is one of the first American musicals to be published in a critical edition.

Career highlights

Selected discography

References

External links

North American Management (Pinnacle Arts Management)

1958 births
Living people
American male conductors (music)
American musicologists
People from Jacksonville, North Carolina
Yale College alumni
Juilliard School alumni
Musicians from North Carolina
American emigrants to the United Kingdom
21st-century American conductors (music)
21st-century American male musicians